Calvin Bombo (born 18 January 1999) is a professional footballer who plays as a midfielder for the Central African Republic national team. Born in France, he represents the Central African Republic at international level.

Club career
In June 2020, Bombo signed his first professional contract with Troyes. He made his professional debut with the club in a 1–0 Coupe de France loss to Auxerre on 19 January 2021. On 6 January 2022, Bombo left Troyes following the termination of his contract.

International career
Born in France, Bombo is of Central African Republic descent. He was called up to represent the Central African Republic national team for a pair of friendlies in June 2021.

References

External links
 
 

1999 births
Living people
Sportspeople from Troyes
French footballers
French sportspeople of Central African Republic descent
Citizens of the Central African Republic through descent
Central African Republic footballers
Central African Republic international footballers
Association football midfielders
ES Troyes AC players
Championnat National 3 players
Footballers from Grand Est